John Arthur Reilly  (born 11 January 1942) is a former Australian rules footballer who played with Carlton Football Club then Footscray in the Victorian Football League.

Originally from South Fremantle, he returned to play for them in 1970 and played in their West Australian Football League premiership winning side. He is the son of former South Fremantle ruckman Jack "Corp" Reilly and the elder brother of Graeme Reilly, who played alongside John in the 1970 premiership.  Graeme died of a brain tumour in February 1975, aged 28, after collapsing at training during the 1974 season.

References

External links

1942 births
Western Bulldogs players
Carlton Football Club players
South Fremantle Football Club players
Australian rules footballers from Fremantle
Living people